Kochkurovsky District (Kočkurbuje; , Kočkurovań ajmak) is an administrative and municipal district (raion), one of the twenty-two in the Republic of Mordovia, Russia. It is located in the south of the republic. Its administrative center is the rural locality (a selo) of Kochkurovo. As of the 2010 Census, the total population of the district was 10,794, with the population of Kochkurovo accounting for 29.6 % of that number.

Administrative and municipal status
Within the framework of administrative divisions, Kochkurovsky District is one of the twenty-two in the republic. The district is divided into eleven selsoviets which comprise thirty-nine rural localities. As a municipal division, the district is incorporated as Kochkurovsky Municipal District. Its eleven selsoviets are incorporated into eleven rural settlements within the municipal district. The selo of Kochkurovo serves as the administrative center of both the administrative and municipal district.

Notable residents 

Olga Kaniskina (born 1985 in Napolnaya Tavla), coach and former race walker

References

Notes

Sources

Districts of Mordovia
 
